The Pyncheon is a rare American breed of true bantam chicken. It is an old breed, developed in the Northeastern United States. The Pyncheon's ancestors are thought to have been brought there from the Netherlands or from Belgium. The breed is mentioned in Nathaniel Hawthorne's The House of the Seven Gables. It is recognized by the American Bantam Association, but not by the American Poultry Association.

Characteristics

The Pyncheon has a single comb followed by a tassel, similar to the Sulmtaler. Often, the comb is not straight due to the crest and veers into an 's' shape. A unique variation of Mille Fleur is the pattern in which they most commonly appear. As with most bantams, it has strong flight capabilities. The Pyncheon is a fair layer of small white eggs. They have a friendly disposition, and a high tendency towards broodiness.

In The House of the Seven Gables

Nathaniel Hawthorne was familiar with the Pyncheon breed, and he bred them himself around the time at which wrote the novel. The chickens in the book mirror the degeneration of the Pyncheon family, whose name they share. Though not explicitly called a bantam, the Pyncheon's small size is referred to several times in the book, as is the breed's antiquity:

A comparison is made between the birds and the Pyncheon family; both of whom bear many similarities, including their haughty airs and dolefulness. The "ancient and respectable fowls", like the Pyncheon family, have a long and noble lineage that is now desecrated:

The peculiarities of the breed are later described further:

See also
 List of chicken breeds

References

External links
 Pictures of the Pyncheon breed can be found here.

Chicken breeds
Chicken breeds originating in the United States
Bantam chicken breeds